The 2012–13 A.C. Siena season was the 107th season in existence and 9th season in the top flight of Italian football, Serie A.

Players

Squad

Serie A

League table

Matches

Legend

Serie A

Coppa Italia

Squad statistics

Appearances and goals

|-
! colspan="10" style="background:#dcdcdc; text-align:center"| Goalkeepers

|-
! colspan="10" style="background:#dcdcdc; text-align:center"| Defenders

|-
! colspan="10" style="background:#dcdcdc; text-align:center"| Midfielders

|-
! colspan="10" style="background:#dcdcdc; text-align:center"| Forwards

|-
! colspan="10" style="background:#dcdcdc; text-align:center"| Players transferred out during the season

Top scorers
This includes all competitive matches.  The list is sorted by shirt number when total goals are equal.
{| class="wikitable sortable" style="font-size: 95%; text-align: center;"
|-
!width=15|
!width=15|
!width=15|
!width=15|
!width=150|Name
!width=80|Serie A
!width=80|Coppa Italia
!width=80|Total
|-
|1
|10
|FW
|
|Innocent Emeghara
|7
|0
|7
|-
|2
|11
|FW
|
|Emanuele Calaiò
|4
|1
|5
|-
|=
|27
|MF
|
|Alessandro Rosina
|5
|0
|5
|-
|4
|91
|FW
|
|Reginaldo
|3
|1
|4
|-
|5
|
|
|
|Own goals
|2
|1
|3
|-
|6
|7
|MF
|
|Francesco Valiani
|2
|0
|2
|-
|=
|8
|MF
|
|Simone Vergassola
|2
|0
|2
|-
|=
|9
|FW
|
|Michele Paolucci
|2
|0
|2
|-
|=
|10
|MF
|
|Gaetano D'Agostino
|0
|2
|2
|-
|=
|24
|DF
|
|Massimo Paci
|2
|0
|2
|-
|=
|57
|FW
|
|Zé Eduardo
|1
|1
|2
|-
|=
|81
|FW
|
|Erjon Bogdani
|2
|0
|2
|-
|13
|6
|MF
|
|Ângelo
|1
|0
|1
|-
|=
|13
|DF
|
|Luís Neto
|1
|0
|1
|-
|=
|16
|MF
|
|Valerio Verre
|0
|1
|1
|-
|=
|77
|MF
|
|Alessio Sestu
|1
|0
|1
|-
|=
|87
|DF
|
|Fabrizio Grillo
|1
|0
|1

Sources

Siena
A.C.N. Siena 1904 seasons